The year 1929 in architecture involved some significant architectural events and new buildings.

Events

September 7 – Ceremony to lay the foundation stone for the new Palace of Nations in Geneva.
November 18 – Ceremony to break the ground for the Umaid Bhawan Palace in Jodhpur, India, designed by Henry Vaughan Lanchester (completed 1943).
Plan of White City (Tel Aviv) in Mandatory Palestine by Patrick Geddes agreed.
 WUWA (Wrocław)

Buildings and structures

Buildings opened
April – Williamsburgh Savings Bank Tower, Brooklyn, New York city, designed by Halsey, McCormack and Helmer.
July 11 – Chapel, Stowe School, England, designed by Sir Robert Lorimer (died September 13).
July 23 – Landakotskirkja, Reykjavik, Iceland.
August 24 – Baker City Tower hotel, Baker City, Oregon, designed by Tourtellotte & Hummel.
October 3 – Dominion Theatre, London, England, designed by W. and T. R. Milburn.
December 1 – Underground Electric Railways Company of London headquarters, 55 Broadway, designed by Charles Holden.

Buildings completed

 Station reconstructions on Berlin U-Bahn, designed by Alfred Grenander.
 The Barcelona Pavilion, designed by Ludwig Mies van der Rohe.
 Royal York Hotel in Toronto, Ontario; it becomes the tallest building in the British Empire.
 Frauenfriedenskirche, Frankfurt, Germany.
 Church of Our Lady & St Alphege, Bath, England, designed by Giles Gilbert Scott (July).
 Lovell House in Los Angeles, designed by Richard Neutra.
 E-1027 vacation home at Roquebrune-Cap-Martin in the south of France, designed for themselves by Eileen Gray and her lover Jean Badovici.
 Imperial Chemical House on Millbank, Westminster, London, designed by Frank Baines.
 Paimio Sanatorium in Finland, designed by Alvar Aalto.
 Boston Avenue Methodist Church in Tulsa, Oklahoma.
 Richfield Tower in Los Angeles, designed by Stiles O. Clements.
 Van Nelle Factory in Rotterdam, Netherlands.
 Plaza de Toros de Las Ventas in Madrid, Spain, designed by José Espeliú.
 Melnikov-House, designed by Konstantin Melnikov.
 Rodmarton Manor in Gloucestershire, England, designed by the Barnsley brothers and Norman Jewson (begun 1909).
 Functionalist villa by Bohdan Lachert in Warsaw, Poland.

Awards
AIA Gold Medal – Milton Bennett Medary
RIBA Royal Gold Medal – Victor Laloux
Grand Prix de Rome, architecture – Jean Niermans

Births

January 11 – Dmitri Bruns, Estonian architect and theorist
February 28 – Frank Gehry, Canadian-American Pritzker Prize-winning architect
April 3 – Fazlur Rahman Khan, Bengal-born structural engineer (died 1982)
May 22 – Neave Brown, American-born British residential architect (died 2018)
June 15 – Derek Walker, English architect and urban planner (died 2015)
July 13 – Richard Vyškovský, Czech architect and creator of paper models (died 2019)
October 11 – Raymond Moriyama, Canadian architect

Deaths

January 25 – Ralph Knott, English architect (born 1878)
February 24 – Lucien Weissenburger, French Art Nouveau architect (born 1860)
April 4 – Francis Conroy Sullivan, Canadian architect and pupil of Frank Lloyd Wright (born 1882)
August 27 – James Knox Taylor, Supervising Architect of the United States Department of the Treasury (born 1857) 
September 13 – Sir Robert Lorimer, Scottish architect and furniture designer (born 1864)
October 15 – Émile Bénard, French architect and painter (born 1844)
December 10 – Axel Berg, prize-winning Danish architect (born 1856)

References